Vladimir Chendarov (born 21 February 1956) is a Soviet archer. He competed in the men's individual event at the 1976 Summer Olympics.

References

1956 births
Living people
Soviet male archers
Olympic archers of the Soviet Union
Archers at the 1976 Summer Olympics
Place of birth missing (living people)